Anjirak (also Romanized as Anjīrak and Anjīrk; also known as Anjarak and Anjerk) is a village in Bezenjan Rural District, in the Central District of Baft County, Kerman Province, Iran. At the 2006 census, its population was 467, in 109 families.

References 

Populated places in Baft County